Aerosmith discography may refer to:

Aerosmith albums discography
Aerosmith singles discography
Aerosmith videography
List of songs recorded by Aerosmith